Miroslav Tanjga (born 22 July 1964) is a Serbian former football played as a defender. He is in charge as Siniša Mihajlović's assistant coach at Serie A club Bologna.

Playing career
Tanjga was in born in Vinkovci, SR Croatia, and grew up in the village of Stari Jankovci. After playing in the Yugoslav First League with several clubs, NK Dinamo Vinkovci, FK Vojvodina and Red Star Belgrade, he moved to first to Turkey, to Fenerbahçe, then to Germany in 1992, and played there the rest of his career, having represented Hertha BSC and 1. FSV Mainz 05.

Coaching career
A longtime friend of Siniša Mihajlović from his playing days at FK Vojvodina, Tanjga returned to work alongside him in 2012 as his assistant for the Serbia national football team.

He re-joined forces with Mihajlović at Torino in 2016, and then followed him also at Bologna in 2019.

Tanjga took over the sidelines from Mihajlović on 11 April as a result of Mihajlović getting treatment for Leukemia. Bologna beat U.C. Sampdoria 2-0 in Tanjga's first match as temporary manager.

References

External links
 

1967 births
Living people
Sportspeople from Vinkovci
Serbs of Croatia
Association football defenders
Yugoslav footballers
Serbian footballers
FK Vojvodina players
HNK Cibalia players
Red Star Belgrade footballers
Fenerbahçe S.K. footballers
Hertha BSC players
1. FSV Mainz 05 players
Yugoslav First League players
Süper Lig players
2. Bundesliga players
Serbian expatriate footballers
Expatriate footballers in Germany
Expatriate footballers in Turkey